Lambert II (died Tournai, 19 June 1054) was count of Leuven between 1033 and 1054. Lambert was the son of Lambert I of Louvain (d. 1015).

According to the Vita Gudilae (recorded between 1048–1051) he followed his brother Henry I of Louvain. 
Lambert scorned both temporal and spiritual authorities and in 1054 even took up arms against Holy Roman Emperor Henry III. He was defeated and lost his life at Tournai.

During his reign Brussels began its growth. Lambert arranged to transfer the remains of Saint Gudula to the St. Michael's church. This church, thereafter known as the Saints Michael and Gudula Church, later became the St. Michael and Gudula Cathedral. Lambert also constructed a fortress on the Coudenberg hill.

Since Lambert II died in 1054, an imperial charter of September 1062 connecting a certain Lambert to the county Brussels, is probably referring to another person.

Family
Lambert of Louvain married Uda of Lorraine (also called Oda of Verdun), daughter of Gothelo I, Duke of Lorraine. Their children were:
 Henry II, Count of Louvain who married Adela of Orthen, a daughter of Count Everard of Orthen (or Betuwe).
 Adela of Louvain, married Otto I, Margrave of Meissen, Count of Weimar. Later married Dedi I, Margrave of the Saxon Ostmark.
 Reginar (Rainier) of Louvain. Killed in the battle of Hesbaye in 1077.

House of Reginar
Counts of Louvain
1054 deaths
Year of birth unknown